The New Democratic Party of Ontario ran a full slate of candidates in the 1977 Ontario provincial election, Canada, and won 33 seats to become the third-largest party in the legislature.

Fred Dickson
Dickson campaigned for the federal New Democratic Party in the 1974 Canadian election, and finished third in St. Catharines against Liberal Party candidate Gilbert Parent.  At the time of the election, Dickson listed his occupation as financial counsellor.

He first campaigned for the Legislative Assembly of Ontario in the 1975 Ontario election, and finished third against Progressive Conservative Robert Johnston.  In 1977, he finished third against Liberal Jim Bradley with 7.556 votes (23.71%).

Dickson also ran for mayor of St. Catharines in the 1977 and 1980 municipal elections.

He ran for provincial secretary of the NDP in 1982, but lost to Michael Lewis (the brother of former party leader Stephen Lewis) by a margin of 1,524 votes to 315.  At the time, he was listed as a resident of Niagara Falls.

Dickson was a Niagara Regional Councillor in the mid-1980s.  In 1985, he criticized local police authorities for using hidden video surveillance to arrest men who had engaged in public sex acts in a restaurant washroom.

References 

1977